USS Triton (SSRN/SSN-586), the only member of her class, was a nuclear powered radar picket submarine in the United States Navy. She had the distinction of being the only Western submarine powered by two nuclear reactors. Triton was the second submarine and the fourth vessel of the United States Navy to be named for the Greek god Triton, (the nomenclature being unusual at the time in that U.S. Navy submarines were usually named for various species of fish.) At the time of her commissioning in 1959, Triton was the largest, most powerful, and most expensive submarine ever built at $109 million (equivalent to $ million in ) excluding the cost of nuclear fuel and reactors. 

In early 1960, the boat became the first vessel to execute a submerged circumnavigation of the Earth in Operation Sandblast. Triton accomplished this objective during her shakedown cruise while under the command of Captain Edward L. "Ned" Beach Jr. Tritons mission as a radar picket submarine was made obsolete after two years by the introduction of the carrier-based Grumman WF-2 Tracer airborne early warning aircraft. She was converted to an attack submarine in 1962 and became the flagship for the Commander, Submarine Forces, U.S. Atlantic Fleet (COMSUBLANT) in 1964. She was decommissioned in 1969, the first U.S. nuclear submarine to be taken out of service.

Triton's hull was moored at the St. Julien's Creek Annex of Norfolk Naval Shipyard in Portsmouth, Virginia as part of the reserve fleet until 1993, though she was struck from the Naval Vessel Register in 1986. In 1993, she was towed to Puget Sound Naval Shipyard to await the Nuclear Powered Ship and Submarine Recycling Program. Triton landed on the keel resting blocks in the drydock basin on 1 October 2007 to begin this recycling process, which was completed effective 30 November 2009. Tritons sail superstructure was saved from the recycling process and is now part of the USS Triton Submarine Memorial Park located on Port of Benton Boulevard in Richland, Washington.

Design history

General characteristics
While serving as fully operational units of the U.S. Navy, the vessels also played key developmental roles. Nautilus introduced the use of nuclear power for ship propulsion. Seawolf utilized a liquid-metal nuclear reactor using liquid sodium as an alternative heat exchange medium to pressurized water. Halibut was the first nuclear-powered submarine to perform a strategic nuclear deterrence patrol armed with Regulus cruise missiles. The Skate-class submarines were the first nuclear-powered submarine class with more than one boat built. Tritons unique contribution to the development of nuclear power for naval propulsion was her dual reactor plant, which provided the speed required for radar picket missions.

Radar picket submarines (Navy classification "SSR") were developed during the post-war period to provide intelligence information, electronic surveillance, and fighter aircraft interception control for forward-deployed naval forces. Unlike destroyers used as radar picket ships during World War Two, these submarines could avoid attack by submerging if detected. However, these were incapable of sustaining the high submerged or surfaced speeds necessary to operate with fast carrier task forces and therefore unsuitable to the task.

Nuclear power offered the only possible solution. Triton was designed in the mid-1950s as a radar picket submarine capable of operating at high speed, on the surface, in advance of an aircraft carrier task force. On 27 September 1959, Triton achieved "well in excess of"  during her initial sea trials.

To meet her radar picket role, Tritons main air search radar initially used the AN/SPS-26, the U.S. Navy's first electronically scanned, three-dimensional search radar which was laboratory tested in 1953. The first set was installed on board the destroyer leader  prior to its installation on board Triton in 1959. Since it was scanned electronically in elevation, the AN/SPS-26 set did not need a separate height-finding radar. A submarine version of SPS-26, designated BPS-10, was under development, and it was slated for installation on Triton. To process her radar, electronic, and air traffic data, Triton had a Combat Information Center (CIC) located in a separate air control compartment, situated between Tritons reactor and operations compartments.

Design work on a nuclear-powered radar picket submarine (SSRN) began in 1954–1955. As initially designed, Triton had a three-level hull, with the Combat Information Center (CIC) (see image) located on the middle level. Also, as initially designed, her displacement was 4,800 tons surfaced and 6,500 tons submerged. Triton initially had the same dual radar system installed on the non-nuclear  radar picket submarines (i.e., BPS-2 search radar and BPS-3 height-finder set) housed in a large, stepped sail (see image). Construction cost was initially estimated at $78,000,000. Subsequent growth of the SAR propulsion plant necessitated the overall increase in Tritons length and tonnage, although without any loss in speed, while the installation of the AN/SPS-26 3-D search radar allowed the elimination of a separate height-finder.

Triton was to be the lead boat of a proposed class of nuclear-powered radar picket submarines. A December 1955 long-range naval planning report envisioned five carrier strike groups, each supported by two radar picket submarines. The total force included two non-nuclear Sailfish-class submarines and eight nuclear submarines. With construction costs for Triton escalating, this long-range requirement was revised in 1957 to provide four nuclear-powered radar picket submarines for a single nuclear-powered carrier group, with the four remaining conventionally powered carrier groups supported by two Diesel-electric radar picket submarines each.

At the time of her construction, Triton was the largest submarine ever built. Her knife-like bow, with its bulbous forefoot, provided improved surfaced sea-keeping for her radar picket role. Her surface sea-keeping was further enhanced by high reserve buoyancy (30%), provided by 22 ballast tanks, the most ever in an American submarine. She was the last submarine to have a conning tower, as well as the last American submarine to have twin screws or a stern torpedo room. She also had a compartment solely for crew berthing, with 96 bunks, and two separate chief petty officers' (CPOs') quarters.

Propulsion
Triton was the only submarine outside of the Soviet Union designed with a two-reactor propulsion plant. Her S4G reactors were seagoing versions of the land-based S3G reactor prototype. Both reactors composed the Submarine Advanced Reactor (SAR) program, a joint venture between the U.S. Navy, Atomic Energy Commission (AEC), and General Electric. However, Triton achieved  during her sea trials (pictured), and her first commanding officer, Captain Edward L. Beach Jr., believed Tritons plant could have reached  "had that been necessary."

Both of Tritons reactors share the same compartment, with the number one reactor located forward and the number two reactor located aft within that compartment. The number one reactor supplied steam to the forward engine room and the starboard propeller shaft. The number two reactor supplied steam to the after engine room and the port propeller shaft. Each reactor could individually supply steam for the entire ship, or the reactors could be cross-connected as required. It is this enhanced reliability, redundancy, and dependability of a dual-reactor plant that was a key factor in the selection of Triton to undertake the first submerged circumnavigation of the world.

Tritons dual-reactor plant met a number of operational and engineering objectives, specifically the high speed requirement to meet her radar picket mission, which continues to be a source of speculation and controversy to this day. During the early 1950s, many engineers at Naval Reactors branch of the U.S. Atomic Energy Commission (AEC) were concerned about depending on single-reactor plants for submarine operations, particularly involving under-the-ice Arctic missions. The presence of two de-aerating feed tanks, which are used only on surface warships, suggested that Tritons twin-reactor plant may have served as a testbed for future multi-reactor surface warships.

Finally, the U.S. Navy was debating the best approach to optimize performance, particularly underwater speed, for its nuclear submarine fleet.

Combat systems

Weapon systems
Tritons armament consisted of six Mark 60 torpedo tubes, four bow and two stern. The Mark 60 system was a -long hydraulic-launch tube that did not have power handling capability. The standard torpedo carried by Triton was the Mark 37, with a weapon load of ten forward and five aft. Tritons first commanding officer, "Ned" Beach, noted the torpedo load in the forward torpedo room could have been doubled with the removal of a single support girder.

Fire control and electronics
Tritons main air search radar was the electronically scanned, three-dimensional AN/SPS-26. Since it scanned electronically in elevation, it did not need a separate height-finding set. When not in use, the SPS-26 radar was lowered into its fairwater housing for stowage within Tritons massive sail (pictured). A submarine version of SPS-26, designated BPS-10, was under development at the time of Tritons construction, slated for eventual installation on Triton.

Tritons target fire-control system (TFCS) was the Mark 101, a post-war development that incorporated target tracking and ranging data into a position keeper, with a pair of analyzers that automatically revised torpedo gyros and settings as the target position changed. This automation greatly simplified a targeting solution for a plotting party. Previously targeting solutions were manually estimated target bearings which were then fed into the Torpedo Data Computer (TDC), a method used throughout the Pacific War. However, while entirely capable of providing efficient fire control solutions against post-war non-nuclear hunter-killer submarines, the Mark 101 proved to be less responsive to the rapid changes associated with nuclear submarine operations.

The Number One periscope was Tritons navigational periscope, and it had a built-in sextant developed by the Kollmorgen Optical Company that allowed navigators to observe celestial bodies in order to obtain an accurate star fix to plot the ship's course and position.

Construction history

Authorization
The U.S. Navy ordered a "large radar picket using the advanced two-reactor system," designated SCB 132, in October 1955 under the United States Department of Defense appropriation for Fiscal Year 1956. This 1956 shipbuilding program was significant because it included authorization for the construction of eight submarines in total, the largest such order since World War II. The 1956 program not only completed the final authorization for all of the U.S. Navy's first-generation nuclear submarines, but with Skipjack, it also marked the initial authorization for a second-generation nuclear submarine. Finally, the 1956 program included the three submarines of the Diesel-electric , the last non-nuclear attack submarines to be built for the U.S. Navy. Henceforth, the U.S. Navy submarine service would be a nuclear-powered force.

Keel-laying
Tritons keel was laid down on 29 May 1956 in Groton, Connecticut, by the Electric Boat Division of the General Dynamics Corporation. Her length presented Electric Boat with many problems during her construction. She was so long her bow obstructed the slipway's railway facility, used for transporting material around the yard. Consequently, the lower half of her bow was cut away to facilitate yard operations and was re-attached just days prior to her launch. Similarly, the last  of her stern was built on an adjoining slip and attached to the rest of the hull before Tritons launch. Her sail was found to be too high to go under the scaffolding, so the top  was cut away and re-attached later.

Even before her launch, there was considerable discussion of Tritons role beyond her radar picket mission. An internal Navy memorandum set forth four options for the submarine's extended use. These included configuration to serve as a command ship (SSCN) for a fleet or force commander, an advanced sonar scout for the fleet, a Regulus missile submarine (SSGN), or a minelaying submarine. However, with the exception of the command ship option, all of these proposed configurations required extensive modification of her original design.

Another potential mission was as an underwater tug, able to rescue disabled submarines under the Arctic ice pack. Tritons first commanding officer, Captain Edward L. Beach Jr., requested plans be drawn up for this modification, which he characterized as "easy and inexpensive". Although there was consideration for a deployment to Arctic waters, there is no evidence that Triton was ever employed as an underwater tug.

Launching

Triton was launched on 19 August 1958, with Louise Willis, the wife of Vice Admiral John Wills USN (ret.), as her sponsor. The principal address was delivered by Admiral Jerauld Wright, the Commander-in-Chief of the U.S. Atlantic Command (CINCLANT), the Commander-in-Chief of the U.S. Atlantic Fleet (CINCLANTFLT) and Supreme Allied Commander Atlantic (SACLANT) for NATO. Over 35,000 guests attended, the largest crowd to witness a submarine launching up to that time.

Fitting out
On 1 February 1959, Triton was provisionally accepted for service in the U.S. Navy, with Captain Beach, the Prospective Commanding Officer (PCO), now designated as Officer-in-Charge. Triton met several key milestones before her commissioning. On 8 February 1959, reactor No. 2 achieved initial criticality, while reactor No 1 achieved this milestone on 3 April 1959.

Two shipboard accidents occurred during Tritons post-launch fitting-out. On 2 October 1958, prior to the nuclear reactor fuel being installed, a steam valve failed during testing, causing a large cloud of steam that filled the number two reactor compartment, and on 7 April 1959, a fire broke out during the testing of a deep-fat fryer and spread from the galley into the ventilation lines of the crew's mess. Neither incident was nuclear related and both were quickly handled by the boat's personnel, with Lieutenant Commander Leslie D. Kelly, the prospective chief engineering officer, being awarded the Navy and Marine Corps Medal for his quick action during the incident on 2 October.

Sea trials
Triton began her sea trials on 27 September 1959. Over the next five days, the boat's systems and equipment were thoroughly tested under the overall direction of Admiral Hyman G. Rickover of the Bureau of Ships' Naval Reactors branch and Captain A. C. Smith, the Supervisor of Shipbuilding at Electric Boat. Triton subsequently executed a four-hour, full-power submerged run and a crash-back maneuver. The only significant problem encountered during her initial sea trials was the overheating of the lubricating oil system for the starboard propeller shaft spring bearing. At the recommendation of Admiral Rickover, a hose was rigged to spray the bearing housing with a steady stream of sea water to keep the shaft cool, as well as a special watch set to monitor the temperature of the lube oil.

Triton began her preliminary acceptance trials (PAT) on 20 September 1959. These trials were conducted under the supervision of Rear Admiral Francis Douglas McCorkle of the U.S. Navy's Board of Inspection and Survey (INSURV). After three days of at-sea tests, Triton was passed by the INSURV as being ready to enter service as a U.S. naval vessel.

Operational history

Commissioning

Triton was commissioned on 10 November 1959 with Captain Edward L. Beach Jr. in command. Vice Admiral Bernard L. Austin, the Deputy CNO for Plans and Policy, made the keynote address, noting:

As the largest submarine ever built, her performance will be carefully followed by naval designers and planners the world over. For many years strategists have speculated on the possibilities of tankers, cargo ships and transports that could navigate under water. Some of our more futuristic dreamers have talked of whole fleets that submerge. Triton is a bold venture into this field.

The widow of the late Rear Admiral Willis A. "Pilly" Lent presented the original ship's bell from the first Triton at the new commissioning ceremony. The late Admiral Lent had been the earlier Tritons first commanding officer. A watercolor painting of the submarine also was presented by the American Water Color Society. The final cost of building Triton, less her reactors, nuclear fuel, and other related costs paid by the AEC, was US$109,000,000, making Triton the most expensive submarine ever built at the time of her commissioning.

Triton was assigned to Submarine Squadron 10, the U.S. Navy's first all-nuclear force, based at State Pier in New London, Connecticut, under the command of Commodore Tom Henry. Triton subsequently completed torpedo trials at Naval Station Newport and conducted other special tests at the Norfolk Navy Base before returning to Electric Boat on 7 December 1959 in order to install special communications equipment, including a prototype of the BRA-3 towed communications buoy system housed in a large fairing located on the after end of the main deck.

On 20 January 1960, Triton got underway to conduct an accelerated series of at-sea testing. Triton returned on 1 February as preparations continued for her forthcoming shakedown cruise, scheduled for departure on 16 February 1960, which involved operating with the command ship , flagship of the U.S. Second Fleet, in northern European waters. On 1 February, Captain Beach received a message from Rear Admiral Lawrence R. "Dan" Daspit (COMSUBLANT) instructing Beach to attend a top secret meeting at The Pentagon on 4 February 1960 that led to the execution of Operation Sandblast, the first submerged circumnavigation of the world.

Shakedown cruise

[[File:Edward L. Beach, Jr.jpg|thumb|right|Captain Beach traces the route of Triton'''s submerged circumnavigation|alt=A balding man holding a small card titled "Ship's Position" writes a black line on a map of the Earth.]]
During her shakedown cruise, Triton successfully executed the first submerged circumnavigation of the world, code named Operation Sandblast, following the same track as the first circumnavigation led by Ferdinand Magellan. The mission's objectives were set forth in the published ship's log (pictured):

For purposes of geophysical and oceanographic research and to determine habitability, endurance and psychological stress – all extremely important to the Polaris program – it had been decided that a rapid round-the-world trip, touching the areas of interest, should be conducted. Maximum stability of the observing platform and unbroken continuity around the world were important. Additionally, for reasons of the national interest it had been decided that the voyage should be made entirely submerged undetected by our own or other forces and completed as soon as possible. TRITON, because of her size, speed and extra dependability of her two-reactor plant, had been chosen for the mission.

The actual mission was summarized by the U.S. Navy's Dictionary of American Naval Fighting Ships:

Triton put to sea on her shakedown cruise on 15 February 1960, bound for the South Atlantic. She arrived in the middle Atlantic off St. Peter and St. Paul Rocks on 24 February to commence a history-making voyage. Having remained submerged since her departure from the east coast, Triton continued on south towards Cape Horn, rounded the tip of South America, and headed west across the Pacific. After transiting the Philippine and Indonesian archipelagos and crossing the Indian Ocean, she rounded the Cape of Good Hope and arrived off the St. Peter and Paul Rocks on 25 April – 60 days and 21 hours after departing the mid-ocean landmark. Only once did her sail break the surface of the sea, when she transferred a sick sailor to USS Macon (CA-132) off Montevideo, Uruguay, on 6 March. She arrived back at Groton, Connecticut, on 10 May, having completed the first submerged circumnavigation of the earth.

Tritons globe-girdling cruise proved invaluable to the United States. Politically, it enhanced the nation's prestige. From an operational viewpoint, the cruise demonstrated the great submerged endurance and sustained high-speed transit capabilities of the first generation of nuclear-powered submarines. Moreover, during the voyage, the submarine collected reams of oceanographic data. At the cruise's conclusion, Triton received the Presidential Unit Citation and Captain Beach received the Legion of Merit from President Dwight D. Eisenhower.Tritons commanding officer during Operation Sandblast, Captain Edward L. Beach, also provided a unique perspective on the circumnavigation in the published log:

The noted historian Bern Dibner placed the significance of Operation Sandblast into historical context:

Also, in his 2000 book Ships of Discovery And Exploration, historian Lincoln P. Paine further noted:

The actual submerged circumnavigation occurred between 24 February and 25 April 1960, covering  in 60 days and 21 hours at the average speed of  while crossing the Equator on four different occasions. Also, the total duration of Tritons shakedown cruise was 84 days 19 hours 8 minutes, covering , and Triton remained submerged for a total of 83 days 9 hours, covering  during her maiden voyage.

The New York Times described Tritons submerged circumnavigation of the world as "a triumph of human prowess and engineering skill, a feat which the United States Navy can rank as one of its bright victories in man's ultimate conquest of the seas."

Initial deployments

Following her post-shakedown availability (PSA), Triton assumed her duties as a radar picket submarine in August 1960. She deployed to northern European waters with the Second Fleet to participate in NATO exercises oriented around detecting and intercepting Soviet bombers overflying the Arctic. Triton also participated in NATO exercises against British naval forces led by the aircraft carriers  and  under the command of Rear Admiral Sir Charles Madden, RN. For two days during these NATO exercises, Rear Admiral Thomas H. Moorer and his flag lieutenant, Lt. William P. Lawrence, were aboard Triton to observe the submarine's radar-picket operations. Triton completed her first overseas deployment with a port visit to Bremerhaven, West Germany, the first by a nuclear-powered vessel to a European port, from 2–9 October 1960, with an estimated 8,000 touring the boat during this port-call.

For the first half of 1961, Triton conducted operational patrols and training exercises with the Atlantic Fleet. This included an at-sea exercise involving low-power testing in support of the development of a proposed natural circulation reactor (NCR). She also deployed to monitor the Soviet 50-megaton hydrogen bomb initiation at Novaya Zemlya in the Arctic Ocean during late October 1961.

During this period, the rising threat posed by Soviet submarine forces increased the Navy's demands for nuclear-powered attack submarines with antisubmarine warfare (ASW) capability. Following the development of the carrier-based Grumman WF-2 Tracer airborne early warning aircraft, Tritons AN/SPS-26 3-D long-range air search radar was no longer needed, and the development of the submarine version of this 3-D radar system, the BPS-10, was canceled in 1960. Accordingly, upon the demise of the Navy's radar picket submarine program, Triton was redesignated SSN-586 on 1 March 1961.

Overhaul and conversionTriton entered the Portsmouth Naval Shipyard in June 1962 for conversion to an attack submarine. Her crew complement was reduced from 172 to 159. She was overhauled and refueled at Groton, Connecticut, from September 1962 to January 1964, which included modification to serve as the flagship for COMSUBLANT. Since the Navy no longer had any plans to use Tritons radar picket capability, her SPS-26 radar set was replaced by a two-dimensional AN/BPS-2 air search radar, with Triton now providing the fleet with an at-sea air strike control capability.Friedman. U.S. Submarines since 1945, p. 253n13.

Because she subsequently served as COMSUBLANT's flagship following her overhaul, one area of continuing speculation is whether Triton was part of the National Emergency Command Post Afloat (NECPA) program. NECPA was tasked to provide afloat facilities for the President of the United States in case of an emergency or war, with the command cruisers  and  assigned to perform this mission.Triton had a number of attributes that made her a potential NECPA platform. Her size allowed ample room for additional shipboard systems and personnel accommodations. Her designed speed provided the capability for rapid transit, and her nuclear power plant offered virtually unlimited endurance and range. The Combat Information Center (CIC) provided substantial command and control capabilities as did the communication buoy system that could receive and send radio transmissions while submerged. As she was a submarine, Triton offered superior protection against nuclear-biological-chemical (NBC) contaminants over surface ships or an airborne command centre. However, the record remains unclear if such an explicit NECPA conversion was ever undertaken for Triton.Polmar, The Naval Institute Guide to the Ships and Aircraft of the U.S. Fleet, 15th ed., p. 158.

Subsequent operations
In March 1964, upon completion of her overhaul, Tritons home port was changed from New London, to Norfolk. On 13 April 1964, she became the flagship for COMSUBLANT. On 20 January 1965, Triton rescued the pilot and a passenger of a charter aircraft that had ditched in the Atlantic Ocean off St. Croix in the Virgin Islands.Largess and Horwitz. "USS Triton: The Ultimate Submersible." Warship 1993, p. 184. Eleven days later, Triton was shifted to her original home port of New London, Connecticut.

Decommissioning and final disposition

Due to cutbacks in defense spending, as well as the expense of operating her twin nuclear reactors, Tritons scheduled 1967 overhaul was canceled, and the submarine—along with 60 other vessels—was slated for inactivation. While Tritons twin reactor plant was designed to be refueled by a submarine tender like other U.S. nuclear submarines, because of the complexity of her zirconium-clad fuel elements, Tritons previous re-fueling had been done in a shipyard during her 1962–1964 overhaul. Although new fuel elements were procured and available for installation, Tritons overhaul was canceled, a source of controversy. One speculation suggests that the cancellation of Tritons overhaul allowed funds to be redirected for the repairs to the supercarrier , which had been extensively damaged off Vietnam.
From October 1968 through May 1969, she underwent preservation and deactivation processes, and she was decommissioned on 3 May 1969. Triton became the U.S. Navy's first nuclear-powered submarine to be taken out of service, and second in the world, after the Soviet Navy's  submarine  in 1968. On 6 May 1969, Triton departed New London under tow and proceeded to Norfolk, Virginia, where she was placed in the reserve fleet. She remained berthed at Norfolk or at the St. Julien's Creek Annex of Norfolk Naval Shipyard in Portsmouth, Virginia, into 1993. She was stricken from the Naval Vessel Registry on 30 April 1986. In August 1993, the hulks of the ex-Triton and the ex-Ray were towed by the salvage tug  to the Puget Sound Naval Shipyard (PSNS), in Bremerton, Washington, arriving on 3 September 1993, to await their turn in the Nuclear Powered Ship and Submarine Recycling Program (SRP).

Effective 1 October 2007, ex-Triton landed on the keel resting blocks in the drydock basin to begin recycling (pictured). The long delay in the disposal of ex-Triton has been attributed to the complexity of her dual reactor plant. Final recycling was completed effective 30 November 2009.

Honors and awards

Presidential Unit Citation
On 10 May 1960, Secretary of the Navy William B. Franke presented the Presidential Unit Citation (PUC) to Triton for Operation Sandblast, the first submerged circumnavigation of the world. Chief Torpedoman's Mate Chester Raymond Fitzjarrald, the chief of the boat, accepted the PUC on behalf of Tritons officers and crew. The citation reads:

For meritorious achievement from 16 February 1960 to 10 May 1960. During this period the TRITON circumnavigated the earth submerged, generally following the route of Magellan's historic voyage. In addition to proving the ability of both crew and nuclear submarine to accomplish a mission which required almost three months of submergence, TRITON collected much data of scientific importance. The performance, determination and devotion to duty of the TRITON's crew were in keeping with the highest traditions of the naval service. All members of the crew who made this voyage are authorized to wear the Presidential Unit Citation ribbon with a special clasp in the form of a golden replica of the globe.

Up to that time, this was only the second time that a U.S. Navy vessel had been awarded the Presidential Unit Citation for a peacetime mission, with the nuclear submarine  receiving the first peacetime PUC in recognition of Operation Sunshine, the first submerged voyage under the North Pole in 1958.Beach. Around the World Submerged, pp. 270, 284. To commemorate the first submerged circumnavigation of the world, all Triton personnel who made that voyage were authorized to wear their Presidential Unit Citation ribbon with a special clasp in the form of a golden replica of the globe (pictured).

Naval Unit Commendation
The citation reads:

For exceptionally meritorious service during a period in 1967. USS Triton conducted important and arduous independent submarine operations of great importance to the national defense of the United States. The outstanding results achieved during the highly successful operations attest to the exceptional professional skill, resourcefulness and ingenuity of Tritons officers and men. Their inspiring performance of duty throughout was in keeping with the highest traditions of the naval service.

Legacy

Triton plaque

In the eight days prior to Tritons departure on her around-the-world submerged voyage, Captain Beach approached Lt. Tom B. Thamm, Tritons Auxiliary Division Officer, to design a commemorative plaque for their upcoming voyage, as well as the first circumnavigation led by Portuguese explorer Ferdinand Magellan. Outside the wreath is the motto AVE NOBILIS DUX, ITERUM FACTUM EST ("Hail Noble Captain, It Is Done Again").

Commodore Tom Henry, commanding Submarine Squadron 10, supervised the completion of the plaque. The carving of the wooden form was done by retired Chief Electrician's Mate Ernest L. Benson at New London. The actual molding of the plaque was done by the Mystic Foundry.

During the homeward leg of her around-the-world voyage, Triton rendezvoused with the destroyer  on 2 May 1960 off Cadiz, Spain, the departure point for Magellan's earlier voyage. Triton broached, and John W. Weeks transferred the finished plaque to Triton for transport back to the United States. The plaque was subsequently presented to the Spanish government by John Davis Lodge, the United States Ambassador to Spain. This plaque is located at the City Hall in Sanlúcar de Barrameda, Spain, and it is mounted on the wall of the city hall with a marble slab memorializing the 1960 Triton submerged circumnavigation.

Duplicates of the Triton Plaque were also presented to the Mystic Seaport Museum in Mystic, Connecticut, and the Naval Historical Association in Washington, D.C., as well as the U.S. Navy Submarine School and the U.S. Navy Submarine Force Library and Museum, both located in Groton, Connecticut.

Triton memorials

 
Triton Light is a navigational beacon on the seawall of the United States Naval Academy in Annapolis, Maryland, where the Severn River meets Spa Creek and the Annapolis harbor. It was donated to the Academy and named for the Greek god by the United States Naval Academy Class of 1945. The crew of Triton provided samples of water taken from the 22 seas through which their boat had sailed during their submerged 1960 circumnavigation. These samples filled a globe built into the Triton Light, and the naming of the light and significance of the globe are explained in a commemorative marker.

Beach Hall is the new headquarters for the United States Naval Institute which was dedicated on 21 April 1999 (pictured). The facility is named after Captain Edward L. Beach Sr., who served as the institute's secretary-treasurer, and his son, Edward L. Beach Jr., who commanded Triton during Operation Sandblast. The dive wheel from Tritons conning tower is on display in the lobby of Beach Hall.Triton was the 2003 inductee into the Submarine Hall of Fame following her nomination by the Tidewater chapter and Hampton Roads Base of the United States Submarine Veterans, Inc. (USSVI). A shadow box filled with Triton memorabilia was placed in Alcorn Auditorium of Ramage Hall located at the U.S. Navy Submarine Learning Center, Naval Station Norfolk.

USS Triton Recruit Barracks (Ship 12) was dedicated in ceremonies at the U.S. Navy's Recruit Training Command, Naval Station Great Lakes, near North Chicago, Illinois, on 25 June 2004. The facility honors the memory of two submarines named Triton and includes memorabilia from both. Triton Hall is the fifth barracks constructed under the RTC Recapitalization Project, covering 172,000 square feet (15,979 square meters) in floor space. The facility is designed to accommodate 1056 recruits, and it includes berthing, classrooms, learning resource centers, a galley, a quarterdeck, and a modern HVAC system. On 17 May 2012, in a dedication ceremony, the long-missing ship's bell was added to the collection of artifacts in Recruit Training Command's USS Triton recruit barracks quarterdeck (pictured).

The USS Triton Submarine Memorial Park is located on the Columbia River, at the end of Port of Benton Boulevard in north Richland, Washington. Its purpose is "to establish a permanent park in north Richland in recognition of all the decommissioned reactor cores off-loaded at the Port's barge slip, transported and stored at the Hanford Site."

The park features Tritons sail superstructure (pictured) and an information display on the history of Triton. The park also serves as a tourist attraction, especially due to its location, since Hanford is the resting place of spent reactor cores from several Navy ships. Planning called for the sail to be cut up for transport and reassembled at the park site. Ground-breaking was initially scheduled to take place on 3 April 2008, with the dedication ceremony set for 19 August 2008 and a Fall 2009 start-date for construction. On 23 October 2009, the Port of Benton encased Tritons conning tower in concrete at its new USS Triton Submarine Memorial Park in north Richland, Washington. In mid-December 2009, the final pieces of Tritons sail were welded together at the park's site. During the 11 August 2010 Port of Benton commission meeting, it was reported that bids for the first phase, which includes the park's electrical lighting system and the pouring the concrete around Tritons sail, would be announced shortly by the port authority. The second phase would involve the park's landscaping, and the third phase would be the installation of a parking lot. The park is part of the Richland Riverfront Trail, a marked hiking trail that focuses on the state of Washington's contribution to the nuclear history of the United States, and it connects to the Sacagawea Heritage Trail. The USS Triton Submarine Memorial Park is located off George Washington Way near the Columbia River, and it was formally dedicated on 10 November 2011, the 52nd anniversary of the commissioning of the USS Triton.

In 2011, the USS Triton, Operation Sandblast, and Captain Edward L. Beach Jr., were included in the Technology for the Nuclear Age: Nuclear Propulsion display for the Cold War exhibit at the U.S. Navy Museum in Washington, DC.

Cultural referencesTritons submerged circumnavigation, Operation Sandblast, was the subject of the ABC television series Expedition! broadcast on Tuesday, 14 February 1961. Hosted by John D. Craig, this episode was titled Saga of the Triton, and it featured film footage from Operation Sandblast with voice-over narration extracted from Captain Beach's logbook.Triton is referenced briefly in three popular Cold War novels. In The Last Mayday by Keith Wheeler (1968), Triton is depicted as participating in a submarine training exercise at the beginning of the novel, with special notice made of her large, rectangular sail. In the 1978 novel Cold is the Sea by Edward L. Beach, the second sequel to his 1955 best-seller Run Silent, Run Deep, Triton is mentioned several times. Also, the under-ice towing capability that was considered for Triton served as a key plot point for the novel. Finally, in The Hunt for Red October by Tom Clancy, the biographical background for Marko Ramius mentions that, while commanding a Charlie-class submarine, Ramius had "hounded [Triton] mercilessly for twelve hours" in the Norwegian Sea. Subsequently, Ramius "would note with no small satisfaction that the Triton was soon thereafter retired, because, it was said, the oversized vessel had proven unable to deal with the newer Soviet designs."

Two films of the period, Voyage to the Bottom of the Sea and Around the World Under the Sea, dramatized globe-circling submerged voyages similar to Operation Sandblast. Also, in the teaser of the episode "Mutiny" of the Voyage to the Bottom of the Sea television series, broadcast on 11 January 1965, the fictional nuclear submarine Neptune is on her shakedown cruise, under the supervision of Admiral Harriman Nelson (Richard Basehart), and when the submarine's port shaft bearing begins overheating, Admiral Nelson orders a hose be rigged to cool the port shaft down with sea water, the same solution Admiral Rickover had suggested during Tritons sea trials.

The 1960 The Button-Down Mind of Bob Newhart comedy album included a sketch entitled "The Cruise of the U.S.S. Codfish" which was a monologue involving the final address by the captain to the crew of a nuclear-powered submarine after completing a two-year-long, around-the-world underwater voyage. Bob Newhart noted in a 2006 interview that:

Captain Beach reportedly played "The Cruise of the U.S.S. Codfish" over the ship's public address system during Tritons first overseas deployment in the Fall of 1960. Antigua-Barbuda issued a commemorative stamp of Tritons 1960 submerged circumnavigation. Also, Triton was the name of one of the submersibles featured in the Submarine Voyage attraction at Disneyland which operated from 1959 to 1998.

50th anniversary of Operation Sandblast

The 50th anniversary of Operation Sandblast and Tritons submerged circumnavigation of the world was celebrated on 10 April 2010, during the 2010 Submarine Birthday Ball held at the Foxwoods Resort Casino in Mashantuket, Connecticut, with Master Chief Petty Officer of the Navy (MCPON) Rick D. West delivering opening remarks (pictured) to the 2,200 attendees. The U.S. Navy Submarine Force Library and Museum sponsored additional events and activities, entitled "9,000 Leagues Under the Sea", between 10 and 12 April and 14–18 April 2010.

Also, on 9 April 2010, retired Admiral Henry G. Chiles Jr., who served in Triton from 1963 to 1966, was the keynote speaker at the graduation class of the Basic Enlisted Submarine School at the New London Naval Submarine Base in Groton, Connecticut. The graduation class was named in honor of Triton, and each graduate received a certificate of course completion and a commemorative coin celebrating the 50th anniversary of Tritons submerged circumnavigation. The Dolphin Scholarship Foundation used the 50th anniversary of Operation Sandblast to promote its Race Around the World fund-raising program to support its Dolphin Scholarship program. Finally, former members of Tritons crew received commemorative souvenirs of the ship's pressure hull at their 2010 re-union.

On 25 April 2010, the University of Texas Marine Science Institute posted a radio program article on its Science and the Sea web site commemorating Operation Sandblast and Triton.

For the 50th anniversary of Operation Sandblast, writer-historian Carl LaVO wrote "Incredible Voyage" for the June 2010 edition of Naval History magazine, and John Beach wrote "The First Submerged Circumnavigation" for the April 1960 issue of The Submarine Review, the official magazine of the Naval Submarine League. Mr. Beach is the nephew of Captain Edward L. Beach, the commanding officer of the USS Triton during Operation Sandblast. Finally, the Naval Institute Press published Beneath the Waves by Dr. Edward F. Finch, a 2010 biography of the late Captain Beach, which includes extensive coverage of Operation Sandblast.

The legacy of Operation Sandblast on its 50th anniversary was summarized by retired Captain James C. Hay who had served on Triton during the historic submerged around-the-world voyage. On the editorial page of the April 1960 issue of The Submarine Review'', the official magazine of the Naval Submarine League, Captain Hay noted:

It is truly a cruise which tested the crew's mettle and proved the skipper's tenacity. More than that, however, it again proved to all who cared to listen that the U.S. Navy could go anywhere, at any time, and do what ever was required. It's a good sea story about doing what had to be done. On the fiftieth anniversary of the First Submerged Circumnavigation it's a good thing to do to re-read about one of the forerunners of all we're done since.

Notes

References

Bibliography

External links

 Triton Park – Port of Benton, Washington , this now is an Archived link.

Radar picket ships of the United States Navy
Experimental nuclear submarines of the United States Navy
1958 ships
Ships built in Groton, Connecticut
Edward L. Beach Jr.
Nuclear submarines of the United States Navy
Cold War submarines of the United States
Recipients of the Presidential Unit Citation (United States)